Khedive is an unincorporated community in Greene County, Pennsylvania, United States.  It is located at an elevation of 1,020 feet (311 m).

History
A post office called Khedive was established in 1882, and remained in operation until being discontinued in 1934. The community was named after Khedive, a royal title in the Middle East.

Notable person
Birdie Cree, professional baseball outfielder for the New York Highlanders

References

Unincorporated communities in Pennsylvania
Unincorporated communities in Greene County, Pennsylvania